Llangadog railway station serves the village of Llangadog near Llandeilo, Carmarthenshire. The station is located at street level at Station Road beside the River Brân. The Garn Goch Iron Age hill fort is about three miles away from this station.

All trains serving the station are operated by Transport for Wales. Like several others on the line, it has an automated half barrier level crossing at one end (in this case the northern one). The barrier sequence for northbound trains has to be initiated by the train crew, so the booked stop here for these is a mandatory one. Southbound trains trigger the crossing using a treadle on approach, so only have to stop here on request.

History
 
The station was opened by the Vale of Towy Railway in 1858 and once had a siding accessing the Co-op Wholesale Society creamery, allowing milk trains to access the site. After rail access ceased in the late 1970s, the creamery continued to operate until 2005, when it closed with the loss of 200 jobs. The site is now occupied by a pet food factory.

There was also a passing loop and second platform here until the mid-1960s, with a substantial main building on the northbound platform, but these (and the large GWR signal box) have been demolished and removed. The site of the southbound platform is now heavily overgrown.

Facilities

The station has only a single active platform, which is provided with a brick, glass and timber waiting shelter, timetable poster board, CIS display and customer help point (like others along the line). The station is also fitted with a payphone. Level access is available from the car park and main entrance to the platform.

Services
There are four trains a day northbound to Shrewsbury from Monday to Saturday (plus a fifth to ) and five southbound to Llanelli and Swansea (the first train in each direction does not run on Saturdays); two trains each way call on Sundays.

References

Further reading

External links 

Railway stations in Carmarthenshire
DfT Category F2 stations
Former Vale of Towy Railway stations
Railway stations in Great Britain opened in 1858
Heart of Wales Line
Railway stations served by Transport for Wales Rail
Railway request stops in Great Britain